Edward Henry Wilkinson (June 20, 1890 – April 9, 1918) was a Major League Baseball player. He was born in Jacksonville, Oregon and died in Tucson, Arizona. Wilkinson batted and threw right-handed.

Wilkinson played for the New York Highlanders in the 1911 season. In ten games, he had three hits in 13 at-bats, with one RBI, and a .231 batting average. Shortly thereafter, he contracted pulmonary tuberculosis, a condition that ended his career and contributed to his early death at the age of 27.

External links
Baseball Reference.com page

References

1890 births
1918 deaths
Major League Baseball outfielders
New York Highlanders players
Baseball players from Oregon
People from Jacksonville, Oregon
Oakland Oaks (baseball) players
Saint Mary's Gaels baseball players
20th-century deaths from tuberculosis
Tuberculosis deaths in Arizona